The Moto X Force is a high-end Android smartphone made by Motorola Mobility. Inside the United States, it is branded as the Droid Turbo 2, available exclusively in the United States for the Verizon Droid brand. It was released on October 27, 2015. The phone is marketed as having "the world's first shatterproof screen."

The Droid Turbo 2 would be the one of the last smartphones to carry the Droid branding with Verizon, as well as one of the last Motorola phones to be released under Google's ownership. Shortly before its release, Google would sell Motorola Mobility to Lenovo.

Hardware
The Moto X Force features a 2 GHz and 1.5 GHz octa-core Snapdragon 810 processor, 3 gigabytes of RAM, 32 or 64 gigabytes of internal storage which can be expanded up to 2 terabytes with a MicroSD card. It has a 5.4-inch AMOLED display, a 3,760 mAh battery as well as support for Motorola's TurboPower and Qualcomm Quick Charge 2.0, as well as PMA and Qi wireless charging standards, and a 21-megapixel main camera flanked by a 5 MP front camera with a flash.

This was the first Droid phone to be customizable through Motorola's Motomaker service, which allows customers to select various materials such as soft touch plastic, Ballistic Nylon from the original Droid Turbo, pebbled Horween leather and Saffiano leather, as well as aluminum frame, screen bezel and accent colors. The service also allows users to add a custom greeting which shows up during the Moto X Force's initial startup screen, and customers who choose the pebbled leather backs can also get a custom engraving.  The 64 GB version comes with a free "Design Refresh" which allows owners to trade in their phone for a newly designed one within a year of the original purchase date. This is also the first Droid device since the Motorola Droid X2 that does not feature a DuPont Kevlar backing, a Motorola Droid trademark that started with the original Droid Razr.

Shatterproof screen
This is the first Motorola smartphone that features Motorola's "ShatterShield" technology, which consists of two touchscreen elements, reinforced by an internal aluminum frame to make it resistant to bending and cracking, although this does not protect against scratches or other superficial screen damage. The top layer of the display is designed to be user-replaceable. The screen and case also have a water repellent nanocoating to protect the device from liquids that could damage internal components.

Variants 
There are three main models of the Droid Turbo 2 or Moto X Force

References

External links
 

Mobile phones introduced in 2015
Smartphones
Motorola mobile phones
Android (operating system) devices
Mobile phones with infrared transmitter